Chontabamba District is one of eight  districts of the province Oxapampa in Peru.

References